Alexandre Sidorenko was the defending champion but chose not to defend his title.

Egor Gerasimov won the title after defeating Tobias Kamke 7–6(7–3), 7–6(7–5) in the final.

Seeds

Draw

Finals

Top half

Bottom half

References
Main Draw
Qualifying Draw

Open Harmonie mutuelle - Singles
2017 Singles